Kübassaare is a village in Saaremaa Parish, Saaremaa in Saare County, western Estonia.

Before the administrative reform in 2017, the village was in Pöide Parish.

Kübassaare Lighthouse is located in the village.

References 

Villages in Saare County